Synpalamides chelone is a moth of the Castniidae family. It is known from Mexico.

References 

Castniidae
Moths described in 1856